Report to the Commissioner is a 1975 American crime drama film based on James Mills' 1972 novel. It involves a rookie cop (Michael Moriarty) in the New York City Police Department who is assigned a special missing person case, which in fact is meant to be a wild-goose chase to back up an undercover female police officer's role as the girlfriend of a drug dealer.

The film was directed by Milton Katselas and features a musical score by Elmer Bernstein. The script is by two Oscar-winning screenwriters, Abby Mann (Judgment at Nuremberg) and Ernest Tidyman (The French Connection). It marked Richard Gere's film debut.

Plot
Beauregard "Bo" Lockley (Michael Moriarty), long-haired and thoughtful, is a new type of undercover detective in the New York Police Department. He is assigned to find a missing young woman (Susan Blakely), but is not told she is actually an undercover officer, whose latest assignment is to get close to a heroin dealer, Thomas 'Stick' Henderson (Tony King), upon whom the department has long been wanting to get the goods. Lockley finds her living with the dealer in the Times Square area of New York City. Frustrated by his presence, as it jeopardizes her assignment, she arranges to meet with Lockley the following morning. But when she misses the appointment he goes to where she and Henderson are living, and in the confused shoot-out that follows Lockley accidentally shoots her dead.

Lockley chases Henderson through the streets and into the Saks Fifth Avenue department store, and the two end up trapped in an elevator between floors, holding guns on each other. The two men bond during the fruitless negotiations that follow, and after some time agree to try to get away through the trapdoor in the ceiling of the elevator. However the entire area is surrounded by heavily armed police, who shoot Henderson dead.

Lockley's and the policewoman's superior officers, determined to save their careers, scramble to come up with a story that would be minimally embarrassing to the department. They claim that Lockley, the woman and the dealer were involved in a lovers’ triangle and that Lockley shot her out of jealousy.

Cast
Michael Moriarty - Bo Lockley
Yaphet Kotto - Richard 'Crunch' Blackstone 
Susan Blakely - Patty Butler 
Héctor Elizondo - Captain D'Angelo 
Tony King - Thomas 'Stick' Henderson 
Michael McGuire - Lt. Hanson 
Edward Grover - Captain Strichter 
Dana Elcar - Chief Perna 
Bob Balaban - Joey Egan (as Robert Balaban) 
William Devane - Asst. D.A. Jackson 
Stephen Elliott - Police Commissioner 
Richard Gere - Billy 
Vic Tayback - Lt. Seidensticker 
Albert Seedman - Detective Schulman 
Mark Margolis - Bartender (uncredited)
Noelle North - Samantha

See also
 List of American films of 1975

External links

1975 films
1975 crime drama films
American crime drama films
Fictional portrayals of the New York City Police Department
Films about the New York City Police Department
Films scored by Elmer Bernstein
Films based on American novels
Films based on crime novels
Films set in New York City
United Artists films
1970s English-language films
Films directed by Milton Katselas
1970s American films